Robert Clarke Shearman (1825–1910) was a notable New Zealand policeman and farmer. He was born in  County Kilkenny, Ireland in 1825.

References

1825 births
1910 deaths
New Zealand police officers
Irish emigrants to New Zealand (before 1923)
People from County Kilkenny